"Long Live the Weekend" is the third single from The Living End's fourth album, State of Emergency. It was released on 20 May 2006 in Australia. The song was one of the most added to Australian radio during April. Despite this, "Long Live the Weekend" did not enter the top twenty – whilst the earlier two singles from the album entered the top ten – peaking on the ARIA charts at twenty-three.

Track listing
 "Long Live the Weekend" (C. Cheney) - 2:59
 "Flood the Sky" (S. Owen)  - 2:56
 "Ape Face" (instrumental) (C. Cheney) - 3:00
 "Blue Moon of Kentucky" (acoustic cover) (Bill Monroe) - 1:54

2006 singles
The Living End songs
2006 songs
EMI Records singles
Songs written by Chris Cheney
Song recordings produced by Nick Launay